"Wanna Love You Girl" is a song written and performed by American singer-songwriter Robin Thicke featuring fellow American musician Pharrell Williams as the lead single from his second album The Evolution of Robin Thicke (2006).

There is also a remix for the song, that features two new verses from American rapper Busta Rhymes.

Conception
Pharrell was at first reluctant to record with Thicke, feeling the then forthcoming album was good enough on its own telling Vibe, "I thought his album was so dope already. I didn't think it was necessary." and stating to MTV, "I felt like it didn't need anything from me,[...]The quality, the musicality, it's just upper-echelon." Label executive Jimmy Iovine advocated the pairing, believing it would be a favorable association for Thicke in the eyes of an audience not yet familiar with his work. With Iovine's support, the two agreed to go forward with the collaboration.

Chart performance
The single was officially released August 9, 2005. While expected to be a big hit, it failed to chart on the Billboard Hot 100 and only peaked at No. 65 on Billboard's Hot R&B/Hip-Hop Songs chart.

Remix
Although the connection with Pharrell did not help propel the single to great chart success as anticipated, it did become a minor hit on urban radio and a popular song in clubs. It was at a club in Miami that it first caught the ear of Busta Rhymes, who was impressed by the people's frenzied reaction to it when it was played. Shortly after, Busta acquired the instrumental and recorded his own verses. The remix began appearing on mixtapes and generated enough interest that Thicke, Busta Rhymes, and Spliff Star went on to shoot an official music video for the remix which was released in the summer of 2006.

Music video
Directed by: Hype Williams
Produced by: Tracey Cuesta
Edited by: Hype Williams
Online Edit by: Gavin Holmes
Director of Photography:  Malik Sayeed
Production Company: Santo Domingo Film & Music Video

The video was filmed in August 2005 in the Dominican Republic. This video was shot with mostly natural lighting using mirrors and bounce boards as the locations were so remote that there were no cables available long enough to connect to the generator. Some of the models were brought from Mexico, Trinidad and Tobago, and two were local models from the Dominican Republic. This video was commissioned by Interscope for Star Trak. Pharrell was flown into the area of the location and then brought by boat to the beach as the roads were too dangerous for access after a hard rain the night before his performance shot. Thicke was also brought by boat to the beach locations and had to be driven in by 4WD to the waterfalls.

References

2005 singles
Music videos directed by Hype Williams
Pharrell Williams songs
Robin Thicke songs
Busta Rhymes songs
Song recordings produced by the Neptunes
Songs written by Pharrell Williams
Songs written by Robin Thicke
2005 songs
Interscope Records singles